Wild kingdom refers to wilderness.

It may also refer to:

Places
 Wild Kingdom Train, Lagoon Amusement Park, Farmington, Utah, US
 Wild Kingdom Train Zoo
 The Wild Kingdom Pavilion, Henry Doorly Zoo and Aquarium, Omaha, Nebraska, US

Arts and entertainment

Television
 Mutual of Omaha's Wild Kingdom (TV series; also airing as Wild Kingdom), a wildlife and nature documentary TV show that started airing in 1963
 Wild Kingdom (video), a 2014 JAV release for AV Open

Episodes
 "Wild Kingdom" (Home Improvement), a 1991 TV episode of Home Improvement
 "Wild Kingdom" (North Woods Law), a 2015 TV episode of North Woods Law
 "Wild Kingdom" (Carmilla), a 2015 TV episode of web series Carmilla; see List of Carmilla episodes
 "Wild Kingdom" (Dick Figures), a 2015 webisode of Dick Figures; see List of Dick Figures episodes

Music

Bands
 Manitoba's Wild Kingdom (band) (formerly "Wild Kingdom"), a NYC based rock band
 Wild Kingdom (band), a successor band to Human Sexual Response (band)

Albums
 Wild Kingdom (album), a 2017 album by Cotton Mather
 Wild Kingdom (album), a 2019 album by The Hot Club of Cowtown

Songs
 "Wild Kingdom" (song), a 1999 track by Dr. Dooom off the album First Come, First Served
 "Wild Kingdom" (song), a 1998 song by 2 Skinnee J's off the album SuperMercado!
 "Wild Kingdom" (song), a 1986 song by Alex Chilton

Literature
 "Wild Kingdom" (story), a 1988 short story by Tom Perrotta

Comics
 Wild Kingdom (comic book), a comic book published by MU Press
 Wild Kingdom (comic book), a Japanese serialized manga comic book by Johji Manabe
 "Wild Kingdom" (comic book), a Marvel Comics story arc written by Peter Milligan; see Peter Milligan bibliography
 "The Wild Kingdom" (chapter), a serialized chapter of the Japanese manga comic book Hayate the Combat Butler; see List of Hayate the Combat Butler chapters

See also

 "Wild, Wild Kingdom" (segment), a 1985 segment of You Can't Do That on Television; see List of You Can't Do That on Television episodes
  Ron Levy's Wild Kingdom (band), a band formed by Ron Levy
 Borth Wild Animal Kingdom, Borth, Wales, UK; a zoo
 York's Wild Kingdom, York Beach, Maine, USA
 Wild Cartoon Kingdom (magazine)

 
 Animal Kingdom (disambiguation)
 Kingdom (disambiguation)
 Wild (disambiguation)